Dichnya is the name of rural localities and rivers in Russia:

 Dichnya, Kursk Oblast, a selo and the administrative center of Dichnyansky Selsoviet Rural Settlement, Kurchatovsky District, Kursk Oblast
 Dichnya, Oryol Oblast, a selo in Turovsky Selsoviet Rural Settlement, Verkhovsky District, Oryol Oblast
 Dichnya (a tributary of the Seym), a river,  a tributary of the Seym River in Kursk Oblast
 Dichnya (a tributary of the Pshevka), a river, a tributary of the Pshevka River in Oryol Oblast